Bome may refer to:

Bome (sculptor), Japanese sculptor
Bomê County, county in Tibet